Joseph C. Decuir is an American fellow of the Institute of Electrical and Electronics Engineers (IEEE) who was nominated in 2015 for contributions to computer graphics and video games.

Early computer games
Decuir was nominated to Fellowship in the IEEE based on his contribution to early video games.  One of his fellow nomination sponsors was Ralph H. Baer.  He is a fellow of the IEEE Consumer Electronics Society, IEEE Computer Society and the IEEE Communications Society.

 Atari Video Computer System, aka 2600: Atari 2600
 Atari Personal Computer System, 800-family: Atari 8-bit family
 Amiga Personal Computer: Amiga

Engineering standards

Decuir made substantial technical and editorial contributions to wired and wireless communications engineering standards, including:

 ITU-T V-series modem standards: V.8, V.8bis, V.32bis V.34, V.80, V.90, V.250, V.251 and V.253
 ITU-T T-series facsimile standards: T.30, T.31 and T.32
 European Telecommunications Standard Institute (ETSI): ETS 300 642: AT Command Set for GSM Mobile Equipment (ME)
 USB Communications Device Class, Wireless Mobile Communications and Network Control Model 
 European Computer Manufacturers Association (ECMA International): ECMA-368, High Rate Ultra Wideband MAC and PHY Standard
 Wireless USB v1.1
 Bluetooth Core Specifications: v3.0, v4.0, v4.1 and v4.2
 Bluetooth Profiles and Services: RESTful API, Internet Protocol Support v1.0, HTTP Proxy Services v1.0

Current engineering related activities

 Lecturer at University of Washington Bothell in Electronics Engineering: https://www.uwb.edu/
 Secretary of IEEE Region 6 - Western United States: http://ieee-region6.org/
 Editor of draft IEEE Standard 2030.10, DC Microgrids: http://smartgrid.ieee.org/p2030-10-standard-for-dc-microgrids-for-rural-and-remote-electricity-access-applications
 IEEE Consumer Electronics Society Board of Governors, 2015-2017: http://cesoc.ieee.org/

Personal life
Decuir is a resident of Issaquah, Washington. He is married to American colorist painter Deborah L.R. "Deb" Freng, and has four children.

Decuir volunteers his time to IEEE Global Humanitarian Conferences.

See also 
 Patents, where Joseph C. Decuir was signed as inventor

References 

Fellow Members of the IEEE
Living people
1950 births
American electrical engineers